Anarkali is a 1955 Indian Telugu-language historical romance film, written and directed by Vedantam Raghavayya. The film stars Akkineni Nageswara Rao and Anjali Devi. It is based on the legend of the romance between Mughal prince Salim (later known as Jahangir) and the eponymous court dancer.

Anarkali was produced by P. Adinarayana Rao, who also composed the music. It was released on 28 April 1955 and became a commercial success, running for over 100 days in many theatres.  It was dubbed in Tamil with the same title.

Plot 
Nadira, a Persian woman, migrates to Agra with her tribe. Bowled over by her mellifluous voice and beauty, Mughal prince Salim introduces himself to her as a soldier and the two fall in love and meet regularly at the pomegranate garden. Once, while strolling in his garden, Emperor Akbar, impressed by Nadira's singing, bestows on her the title "Anarkali", meaning "pomegranate blossom". Thereafter, Salim has entrusted the responsibility as a chief commander for war at Kabul, distressed Anarkali also leaves to know the whereabouts of Salim. To her misfortune, she is caught by burglars and while they are auctioning her prince Salim purchases her. On that night, they are completely under flow of romance when Man Singh I caveats the prince regarding his vocation. Immediately, Salim onslaught into the battlefield, grievously injured and goes into a coma. Right now, Man Singh I back-pedals him to Agra when Anarkali also follows. During that plight, her singing brings back to consciousness to Salim when hearten Akbar makes her the court dancer. Spotting her at the court Man Singh I warns to discard but she refuses. Meanwhile, Anarkali acclaims paramount in the court which upsets Gulnar, the former court dancer, who has secret ambitions to marry the prince.

On the occasion of Salim's coronation celebration, an envied Gulnar conspires and mixes alcohol in Anarkali's drink. Under its influence, Anarkali expresses her love for Salim which angers Akbar who orders her to be imprisoned. At that juncture, Salim expresses his love for her to his mother Jodha Bai and requests to couple up them. But Akbar rejects the proposal, so Salim rebels and amasses an army to confront his father to rescue Anarkali but Jodha Bai bar him. Right now, Akbar orders capital punishment for the lovers to decapitate Salim and Anarkali is taken to a distant place to entombed alive. At that point in time, everyone shows averse to mete out Salim, so, it is mandatory to the Emperor to do so but he collapses due to the affection of his son. Being cognizant of Anarkali entombment, Salim rushes to save her when Gulnar backstabs him, by the time he reaches there, Anarkali is already buried. Grief-stricken, Salim bangs his head on her grave and dies.

Cast 
 Anjali Devi as Anarkali
 Kannamba as Jodha Bai
 Nageswara Rao as Salim
 S. V. Ranga Rao as Akbar
 V. Nagayya as Man Singh
 S. Balasaraswathi as Gulnar
 Gadiraju Kesavarao as Tansen

Production 
After Paradesi (1953), the inaugural production of Anjali Pictures was an average success at the box office, its producers – husband and wife P. Adinarayana Rao and Anjali Devi – considered making their sophomore production based on folklore. The 1953 Hindi film Anarkali, which was based on the legendary romance between Mughal prince Salim (later known as Jahangir) and the eponymous court dancer, was a success and caught their attention, prompting them to adapt the same story in Telugu with the same title, while putting their folklore film plans on hold (this project would later be revived as Suvarna Sundari, released in 1957).

Vedantam Raghavayya was chosen as director and screenwriter, Samudrala Sr. as dialogue writer, Kamal Ghosh for cinematography, N. S. Prakasam for editing, and A. K. Sekhar as art director alongside Vali and Thota. Anjali Devi, besides presenting the film, also played the title character. Gadiraju Kesavarao, an associate director, also appeared briefly as the musician Tansen. Anarkali began production on 11 March 1954 at Neptune Studios. The outdoor scenes were shot at Mysore.

Soundtrack 
The soundtrack was composed by P. Adinarayana Rao, while the lyrics were written by Samudrala Sr. Though the soundtrack consisted predominantly of original compositions, two were borrowed from the 1953 film. "Ravoyi Sakhaa" was adapted from "Aa Jaane Wafaa", and "Jeevitame Saphalamu" was adapted from "Yeh Zindagi Usi Ki Hai".

Tamil songs
Lyrics were by Thanjai N. Ramaiah Dass. All the tunes for all the songs and singers for both languages are the same.

Release and reception 
Anarkali was released on 28 April 1955. The film was a commercial success, running for over 100 days in many theatres. Its namesake Tamil-dubbed version was also successful.

References

External links 
 

1950s biographical films
1950s historical romance films
1950s Telugu-language films
1955 films
Biographical films about royalty
Cultural depictions of Akbar
Cultural depictions of Jahangir
Films about courtesans in India
Films about royalty
Films directed by Vedantam Raghavayya
Films scored by P. Adinarayana Rao
Films set in the 16th century
Films set in the Mughal Empire
Historical epic films
Indian biographical films
Indian epic films
Indian historical romance films
Indian romantic drama films
Romantic epic films
Indian black-and-white films